The black-billed weaver (Ploceus melanogaster) is a species of bird in the family Ploceidae. It has a discontinuous distribution from extreme eastern West Africa through parts of Central Africa to East Africa.

References

External links
 Black-billed weaver -  Species text in Weaver Watch.

black-billed weaver
Birds of Sub-Saharan Africa
Birds of West Africa
Birds of the Gulf of Guinea
Birds of Central Africa
Birds of East Africa
black-billed weaver
Taxonomy articles created by Polbot
Taxa named by George Ernest Shelley